The name Jolina has been used in the Philippines by PAGASA in the Western Pacific. The name was possibly derived from a local artist named Jolina Magdangal, which in 2001 it made a controversy upon releasing the revised name of typhoon.
 Tropical Depression Jolina (2001) – a tropical depression that was only recognized by PAGASA.
 Typhoon Nabi (2005) (T0514, 14W, Jolina) – struck Japan.
 Tropical Storm Goni (2009) (T0907, 08W, Jolina)
 Severe Tropical Storm Jebi (2013) (T1309, 09W, Jolina) – struck the Philippines, China and Vietnam.
 Severe Tropical Storm Pakhar (2017) (T1714, 16W, Jolina)
 Severe Tropical Storm Conson (2021) (T2113, 18W, Jolina) - rapidly intensified into a typhoon in less than 24 hours, according to PAGASA.

The name Jolina was retired from the PAGASA naming lists after the 2021 season. It will be replaced by Jacinto in the 2025 season.

References

Pacific typhoon set index articles